The 2017 Turkmenistan Higher League (Ýokary Liga) season is the 25th season of Turkmenistan's professional football league. It runs between March and December 2017. Three times winner Altyn Asyr are the defending champions from the 2016 campaign. They are again favorites for this campaign.

Format changes
After the 2016 season Yedigen were denied an entry for the 2017 season, and no team from the Birinji liga managed to obtain a license for the 2017 season.
Meaning that only 9 teams would contest for the title. Exceptionally there will be no relegation at the end of the season.

Teams
A total of 9 teams will contest the league.

League table

External links
Football Federation of Turkmenistan

Turk
Ýokary Liga seasons